California's 24th congressional district is a congressional district in the U.S. state of California. The district is currently represented by Salud Carbajal. It contains all of Santa Barbara County, most of San Luis Obispo County, and part of Ventura County. Cities in the district include Santa Barbara, Ventura, San Luis Obispo, Santa Maria, and Ojai.

Prior to redistricting in 2011, the district covered the inland portions of Ventura and Santa Barbara counties, as well as a sparsely-populated portion of the Ventura County coast. Redistricting in 2021 removed the northern part of San Luis Obispo County and added the cities of Ojai and Ventura.

Results in statewide elections

Composition

As of the 2020 redistricting, California's 24th congressional district is located on the southern edge of the Central Coast. It encompasses Santa Barbara County, most of San Luis Obispo County and part of Ventura County. The district also takes in six of the Channel Islands.

San Luis Obispo County is split between this district and the 19th district. They are partitioned by Highway 1, Cayucos Creek Rd, Thunder Canyon Rd, Old Creek Rd, Santa Rita Rd, Tara Creek, Fuentes Rd, Highway 41, San Miguel Rd, Palo Verde Rd, Old Morro Rd, Los Osos Rd, San Rafael Rd, Atascadero Ave, San Antonio Rd, N Santa Margarita Rd, Santa Clara Rd, Rocky Canyon Truck Trail, Highway 229, Lion Ridge Rd, O’Donovan Rd, Highway 58, Calf Canyon Highway, La Panza Rd, Upton Canyon Rd, Camatta Creek Rd, San Juan Creek, and Bitterwater Rd. The 24th district takes in the cities of San Luis Obispo, Arroyo Grande, Morro Bay, and Grover Beach, as well as the census-designated places Nipomo and Los Osos.

Ventura County is split between this district and the 26th district. They are partitioned by Highway 150, Los Padres National Park, Highway 33, Cozy del, Cozy Ojai Rd, Shelf Road Trail, Gridley Rd, Grand Ave, Thatcher Creek, Boardman Rd, Sulphur Mountain Rd, Cahada Larga Rd, Highway 33, Shell Rd E, Manuel Canyon Rd, Aliso St, Willoughby Rd, Aliso Canyon Rd, Foothill Rd, N Wells Rd, Highway 126, Highway 118, Brown Barranca, Montgomery Ave, Telephone Rd, Ramelin Ave, Harmon Barranca, Johnson Dr, S Victoria Ave, Highway 101, E Harbor Blvd, and Olivias Park Dr. The 24th district takes in the city of Ventura.

Cities & CDP with 10,000 or more people
 Ventura - 110,763
 Santa Maria - 109,707
 Santa Barbara - 88,665
 Lompoc - 44,444
 Orcutt - 35,262
 Goleta - 32,690
 Arroyo Grande - 18,441
 Nipomo - 18,182
 Los Osos - 16,533
 Isla Vista - 15,500
 Grover Beach - 13,459
 Carpinteria - 13,264
 Morro Bay - 10,757

List of members representing the district

Election results

1952

1953 (Special)
Republican Glenard P. Lipscomb won the special election to replace fellow Republican Norris Poulson, who was elected Mayor of Los Angeles. Data for this special election is not available.

1954

1956

1958

1960

1962

1964

1966

1968

1970 (Special)

1970

1972

1974

1976

1978

1980

1982

1984

1986

1988

1990

1992

1994

1996

1998

2000

2002

2004

2006

2008

2010

2012

2014

2016

2018

2020

See also

List of United States congressional districts

References

External links
GovTrack.us: California's 24th congressional district
RAND California Election Returns: District Definitions
California Voter Foundation map - CD24

24
Government of San Luis Obispo County, California
Government of Santa Barbara County, California
Government of Ventura County, California
Arroyo Grande, California
Atascadero, California
Cambria, California
Channel Islands National Park
Goleta, California
Lompoc, California
Los Padres National Forest
San Emigdio Mountains
San Luis Obispo, California
San Rafael Mountains
Santa Barbara, California
Santa Maria, California
Santa Ynez Mountains
Santa Ynez Valley
Solvang, California
Topatopa Mountains
Constituencies established in 1953
1953 establishments in California